Rumsen, Rumsien, or San Carlos Costanoan may refer to:
 Rumsen people, an ethnic group of California
 Rumsen language, a language of California

See also 
 Ramsen (disambiguation)

Language and nationality disambiguation pages